U.S. Route 19W (US 19W) traverses approximately  from Cane River, North Carolina to Bluff City, Tennessee.

Route description

US 19W begins in western Yancey County in the community of Cane River, at the intersection of US 19/US 19E.  Several signs at the beginning of the route strongly recommend truckers against using this route.  The road then proceeds north through the Pisgah National Forest, connecting the communities of Elk Shoal, Ramseytown and Sioux, to the Tennessee state line (near Spivey Gap), a  drive of frequent curves and elevation changes.

Once past the state line, the road enters the Cherokee National Forest, and is much the same for another  to SR-352/Flag Pond Road. From Flag Pond Road, it is just  to Interstate 26 (I-26), where US 19W merges with the interstate to Johnson City. US 19W overlaps with I-26/US 23 from exit 43 (Hill Road) to exit 20 (Roan Street).

History
Established in 1930, US 19 was split at Cane River into US 19E and US 19W.  US 19E follows the original routing via Spruce Pine and Elizabethton to Bluff City.  US 19W was rerouted with US 23 and NC 692 into Tennessee, then through the cities of Erwin and Johnson City, before rejoining US 19E in Bluff City.  In late 1934, NC 692 was dropped along the route; then in 1952, US 23 abandoned US 19W in North Carolina by rerouting west through Faust and Wolf Laurel, meeting back at Ernestville. In 1984, US 19 was realigned on a straighter path in Yancey County; US 19W was thus extended .

North Carolina Highway 692

North Carolina Highway 692 (NC 692) was established in 1923 as new primary routing to Tennessee; NC 692 was the original highway number from Cane River to Spivey Gap.  In 1929, NC 692 was truncated at Sioux, replaced by an extension of NC 19 from Bakersville.  In 1930, US 19W and US 23 were overlapped on the remaining section of NC 692.  In late 1934, NC 692 was decommissioned.

Junction list

See also

References

External links

 
 NCRoads.com: U.S. 19W

W-19
19-W
19-W
19-W
Transportation in Yancey County, North Carolina
Transportation in Unicoi County, Tennessee
Transportation in Carter County, Tennessee
Transportation in Washington County, Tennessee
Transportation in Sullivan County, Tennessee